The 2012 American Boxing Olympic Qualification Tournament was held in Rio de Janeiro, Brazil from May 5 to May 12 to determination qualification spots for Boxing at the 2012 Summer Olympics.

Qualified athletes

Qualification summary

NOTE: This chart only lists slots qualified by way of the 2012 American Boxing Olympic Qualification Tournament and does not include slots obtains by NOCs by other means, such as though the 2011 World Amateur Boxing Championships.

Results

Light flyweight

Flyweight

Bantamweight

Lightweight

Light welterweight

Welterweight

Middleweight

Light heavyweight

Heavyweight

Super heavyweight

See also
 Boxing at the 2012 Summer Olympics – Qualification

References

 Men's Light Fly 46-49kg
 Men's Fly 52kg
 Men's Bantam 56kg
 Men's Light 60kg
 Men's Light Welter 64kg
 Men's Welter 69kg
 Men's Middle 75kg
 Men's Light Heavy 81kg
 Men's Heavy 91kg
 Men's Super Heavy +91kg

External links
 AIBA

American Olympic Qualification
Boxing Olympic Qual
American Boxing Olympic Qualification Tournament
Boxing Olympic Qual